Nuphar variegata (variegated pond-lily, bullhead pond-lily or yellow pond-lily) is a plant in the water lily family, Nymphaeaceae. It is native to much of Canada and the northernmost of the United States.

Description 
Nuphar variegata is an aquatic plant with alternate, simple leaves, on submerged stems.  The leaves tend to float on the surface of the water, rather than emerge above as in other Canadian species of Nuphar. The flowers are yellow, borne in summer.

References 

Nymphaeaceae
Flora of North America
Aquatic plants
Plants described in 1866